Antanas Guoga (born 17 December 1973), more commonly known as Tony G, is a Lithuanian-Australian businessman, poker player, politician and philanthropist. In November 2020, Antanas was elected to the 2020–2024 legislative period of the Seimas of the Republic of Lithuania in the Labour Party group.

During 2014–2019 he was a Member of the European Parliament for the Liberal Movement, and from 2016  European Peoples Party. In May 2016, Guoga was the temporary leader of the Liberal Movement following the bribery scandal that prompted Eligijus Masiulis to step down after potentially corrupt activities.

Biography 
Guoga spent his childhood in Kaunas and in the Alytus district (Kalesninkai) in Lithuania. When he was 11 years old, he moved to Australia. Guoga lived in Melbourne where he graduated from school, and had various jobs, including repairing sewing machines and washing cars.

Politics 
In November 2020 he was elected to the Labour Party Group in the Lithuanian national parliament: the Seimas,

Member, Labour Party Political Group 
Deputy Chair, Committee on Foreign Affairs
Head, Group for Inter-Parliamentary Relations with the People's Republic of China, Australia and Oceania and the United Arab Emirates

Main areas of engagement: Legislation and parliamentary scrutiny

Activities: Law-making, including consideration of draft legal acts, assessment of legislative proposals and submission of conclusions to the Seimas, drawing of conclusions regarding international treaties of the Republic of Lithuania and other foreign policy matters considered by the Seimas; 
Contribution to shaping of international trade and development cooperation policy;
Debates on representation of the Seimas at international organisations, submission of recommendations concerning the activities of the Seimas delegations, co-ordination of activities of the groups for inter-parliamentary relations; parliamentary scrutiny of the ministries and other governmental agencies implementing foreign policy, submission of proposals and recommendations on the improvement of their activities; Cultivation and development of relations, in co-operation with governmental and non-governmental organisations.

Guoga was a member of the Alliance of Liberals and Democrats group in the European Parliament until 4 October 2016. He became a member of the European People's Party which is the biggest party in the Parliament. He worked on a range of digital policies in the Internal Market and Consumer Protection Committee (IMCO). Guoga was actively involved in a number of Digital Single Market topics. Being an entrepreneur himself, Guoga worked for better conditions for European businesses, especially in the technology sector. These conditions include smarter regulations, less red tape, and policies that encourage innovation and entrepreneurship.

In 2015 Guoga was chosen as the Lithuanian representative in the POLITICO 28 list. The European affairs weekly newspaper chose one person from each of the European Union's 28 member-states who is "shaping, shaking and stirring Europe."

Guoga was elected as the vice-chairman of the European Parliament delegation to Armenia, Azerbaijan and Georgia, appointed as a member of the Euronest Parliamentary Assembly, a substitute member of the delegation for relations with Switzerland and Norway in the EU-Iceland Joint Parliamentary Committee and in the European Economic Area (EEA) Joint Parliamentary Committee. He was also a substitute member in the Employment and Social Affairs Committee (EMPL).

Guoga is Coder Dojo and entrepreneurship education ambassador in Lithuania. In 2016, he launched Coder Dojo movement in Lithuania and was one of the organisers of programming clubs for 7–17 years old youth in the country.

For four years in a row, 2015, 2016 and 2017 he organized the biggest ICT and entrepreneurship event in the Baltics #SWITCH!
This event in 4 years has grown by 60%  from 6000 participants in 2015 to 15000 in 2018. About 200 speakers from 16 countries already participated in the event. Among them was Vice-President of the European Commission for the Digital Single Market Andrus Ansip, Vytenis Andriukaits, EC Commissioner and representatives of tech leaders such as Microsoft, Amazon, Google, Facebook, Uber, Allegro, Dash, Dell, Oath, Nasdaq, Mastercard, Tele2

In 2016–2017, Guoga was Chief Investment Officer to the Mayor of Vilnius, Remigijus Šimašius.

Guoga was nominated as a candidate for the European parliamentary elections at the summer congress of the Liberal Movement in the last week of June 2013.

Guoga was second in the list of the Lithuanian Liberal Movement in the elections to the European Parliament 2014, and was elected as the MEP with 97,907 votes ending on top of the list.

After the corruption allegations of Eligijus Masiulis, Guoga became a temporary chairman of the Liberal Movement. After public criticism by the party members, Guoga left the party on 17 May 2016.

On 9 March 2019 Guoga announced that he would seek re-election to the European Parliament with the Lithuanian Centre Party. The party received 5.13% of the national vote and did not receive any representatives in the European Parliament.

Poker 

As a child, Guoga was the Rubik's Cube champion of Lithuania before moving to Melbourne, Australia, at the age of 11. He has played poker since the age of 18, and is known for his outlandish table talk and frequent attempts at intimidation of his opponents. He had a fifth-place finish in the World Poker Tour Grand Prix de Paris 2003. He finished in the money twice at the 2004 World Series of Poker in Seven-card stud and Pot Limit Texas hold 'em tournaments and three months later earned his then biggest tournament money finish in the WPT Grand Prix de Paris 2004, where his second-place finish to England's Surinder Sunar earned him $414,478. He finished on the bubble later in the same month at the WPT 2004 Mirage Poker Showdown. On 7 August 2005 he won the £5,000 no-limit Texas hold 'em Main Event of the European Poker Championships, earning £260,000 ($456,822). Later in 2005, he made the final table of the World Speed Poker Open.

He wore a kimono throughout the event to promote poker in Japan. Also in 2006, he finished second to Yosh Nakano while representing Australia in the inaugural Intercontinental Poker Championship, taking down $150,000. True to his reputation, Tony G launched many verbal assaults against his opponents, most notably when he eliminated Russian Ralph Perry in fourth place. Tony G started to provoke Perry when he was deciding how to play his hand before the flop. When Perry called Tony G's all-in with a worse hand (K-J), Tony G proceeded to ridicule and lecture him. Tony's comments were so scathing that it prompted commentator Gabe Kaplan to quip "I think Tony G is speaking more like a Lithuanian than an Australian" and "Tony G could single-handedly reignite the Cold War". Guoga was more respectful of some other players, such as Doyle Brunson, calling Doyle his idol after eliminating him.

In November 2006, he won the Asian Poker Tour event held in Singapore, walking away with $451,700, half of which he indicated he will give to Asian and Australian charities to be nominated by Betfair. In February 2007, he appeared on the NBC television program Poker After Dark, coming in third place behind winner Phil Ivey. In November of the same year, he won a tournament in Moscow, earning $205,000. Often telling his opponents that he has a "big heart", Guoga claims that he left all of his prize money with the officials to give to Russian orphanages, having been inspired to do so by Barry Greenstein's habit of donating all his poker tournament winnings to charity. In January 2008, Guoga received the Shining World Leadership Award in Melbourne Australia. As of 2011, his total live tournament winnings exceed $4,000,000. His 15 cashes at the WSOP account for $429,897 of those winnings. Guoga is also the principal owner of a network of high-traffic poker information sites, including Pokernews.com, Pokeraffiliateworld.com and Pokerworks.com.

In 2009, Guoga was a founding inductee into the Australian Poker Hall of Fame.

On 23 February 2010, in Vilnius, Guoga established the Lithuanian Poker Federation.

In 2014, Guoga confirmed that he will not be returning to professional poker.

Tony G occasionally plays high-stakes cash game poker. In 2018, he took part in the PartyPoker "The Big Game" High Stake PLO cash game alongside poker pros like Isildur1, Sam Trickett and casino owner, Rob Yong.

Other sports 

Guoga is currently a major sponsor of the Lithuanian Basketball Federation. When the country's national team failed to directly qualify for the 2010 FIBA World Championship in Turkey and had to apply for a wild-card entry, he paid a large share of the application fee of €500,000. The team was chosen for the tournament, and won the bronze medal with TONYBET printed on their jerseys. He was the national basketball team's manager from 2010 until 2012 and served as the vice-president of the Lithuanian Basketball Federation. He was also the main sponsor of BC Prienai, a professional basketball club.

In 2014, Guoga became the vice-president of the Lithuanian Rowing Federation.

Business 
Guoga is director and CEO of Cypherpunk Holdings. On September 30, 2021 Tony Guoga announced that Cypherpunk Holdings has acquired two million shares of Animoca Brands for approximately $2.055 million Canadian dollars.

Controversy

Paradise Papers 
In November 2017 an investigation conducted by the International Consortium of Investigative Journalism cited his name in the list of politicians named in "Paradise Papers" allegations.

Achievements 
 2004 WPT – Grand Prix de Paris – 2nd place
 2005 European Poker Championships – 1st place
 2006 Intercontinental Poker Championship – Grand Final – 2nd place
 2006 Betfair Asian Poker Tour – 1st place
 2007 World Series Of Poker – Europe, London – 3rd place
 2007 Moscow Millions, Main Event – 1st place
 2008 Shining World Leadership Award
 2008 PartyPoker Premier League Poker III – 2nd place
 2009 40th World Series of Poker (WSOP) 2009, Anniversary Event – 10th place
 2009 EPT – Grand Final (Monte Carlo), High Roller Championship – 3rd place
 2010 Aussie Millions Poker Championship, A$100k Challenge – 5th place
 2010 The Poker Lounge, Episode 10-1 place
 2010 WPT London High Roller – 2nd place
 2011 delfi.lt readers recognized him as the Lithuanian of the World
 2011 Verslo švyturys Award
 2012 Aussie Millions Poker Championship, A$100k Challenge – 4th place
 2012 PartyPoker Premier League Poker V – 5th place
 2015 POLITICO 28 list (28 people from the European Union’s 28 member states who are transforming European politics)
 2016 A. Guoga was included in the POLITICO 40 list as one of the most influential MEPs.
 2017 MEP Antanas Guoga, the only member of the European Parliament and Lithuanian to be included in the TOP 200 list of Philanthropists and Social Entrepreneurs, compiled by the positive content portal Richtopia.

Personal life
Since 2014, Guoga has been married to Aistė Šlapokaitė, a former psychology student and a photo model for clothing brands like Armani Jeans, Prada and Max Mara. Guoga and Šlapokaitė met during her 30th birthday celebrations in a Vilnius night club. Together they have two sons (Herkus, born in 2015 in Brussels and Tauras, born in 2016 in Vilnius). Guoga also has a son and three daughters from previous relationships.

References

External links
 
 Tony G. Interview

1973 births
Living people
Lithuanian poker players
World Poker Tour winners
Gambling writers
Poker players from Melbourne
MEPs for Lithuania 2014–2019
Liberal Movement (Lithuania) politicians
Lithuanian Centre Party politicians
Labour Party (Lithuania) politicians
Businesspeople from Kaunas
Businesspeople from Vilnius
People named in the Paradise Papers